Smith Farm or Smith Farmhouse or variations may refer to:

Sylvester Smith Farmstead, Boswell, Arkansas, listed on the National Register of Historic Places in Izard County, Arkansas
Smith Farm (Plainfield, Indiana), listed on the National Register of Historic Places in Hendricks County, Indiana
Samuel G. Smith Farm, Richmond, Indiana, listed on the National Register of Historic Places in Wayne County, Indiana 
Smith Farmhouse (Lake City, Iowa), listed on the National Register of Historic Places in Calhoun County, Iowa
Smith–Lyon Farmhouse, Southbridge, Massachusetts, listed on the NRHP in Massachusetts
Orie J. Smith Black and White Stock Farm Historic District, Kirksville, Missouri, listed on the National Register of Historic Places listings in Adair County, Missouri
Smith–Mason Farm, Harrisville, New Hampshire, listed on the National Register of Historic Places in Cheshire County, New Hampshire
Henry Smith Farmstead, Huntington Station, New York, listed on the National Register of Historic Places in Huntington (town), New York
Henry Tunis Smith Farm, Nassau, New York, listed on the National Register of Historic Places in Rensselaer County, New York
 Smith Family Farm, the boyhood home of Joseph Smith, founder of Mormonism, and site of early historic events in the religion.
Edward Smith Jr. Farm, Washington Court House, Ohio, listed on the National Register of Historic Places in Fayette County, Ohio
Henry Smith Farm, Middletown, Pennsylvania, listed on the National Register of Historic Places in Dauphin County, Pennsylvania
Smith Family Farmstead, New Hope, Pennsylvania, listed on the National Register of Historic Places in Bucks County, Pennsylvania
Smith–Gardiner–Norman Farm Historic District, Middletown, Rhode Island, listed on the NRHP in Rhode Island
Jessie Smith Farmstead, Volin, South Dakota, listed on the National Register of Historic Places in Yankton County, South Dakota
Robert Andrew Smith Farm, Murfreesboro, Tennessee, listed on the National Register of Historic Places in Rutherford County, Tennessee
Smith Farmhouse (Pasquo, Tennessee), listed on the National Register of Historic Places in Davidson County, Tennessee
Samuel Gilbert Smith Farmstead, Brattleboro, Vermont, listed on the National Register of Historic Places in Windsor County, Vermont
Peter Smith Farm–Donation Land Claim, Parkland, Washington, listed on the National Register of Historic Places in Pierce County, Washington
Watters Smith Farm on Duck Creek, Lost Creek, West Virginia, listed on the NRHP in West Virginia
Terwilliger–Smith Farm, Kerhonkson, New York, listed on the NRHP in Ulster County, New York